Wassila Rédouane-Saïd-Guerni (born 28 April 1980) is an Algerian foil fencer.

She participated in the 2000 and 2004 Olympic Games, but lost her first match on both occasions.

In March 2001 she married retired middle-distance runner Djabir Saïd-Guerni. The couple met at the 2000 Olympic Games and live in Aubervilliers, France. They have divorced since, and Wassila Redouane is currently training and competing for France.

References

External links
Yahoo! Sports

1980 births
Living people
Algerian female foil fencers
Fencers at the 2000 Summer Olympics
Fencers at the 2004 Summer Olympics
Olympic fencers of Algeria
Place of birth missing (living people)
21st-century Algerian women
20th-century Algerian women